Matti Bye (born July 25, 1966) is a Swedish pianist and composer. He has composed music for over 30 films and TV series as well as additional scores for Theatre and Dance pieces. In 2014, he was nominated twice at Sweden´s Guldbagge Awards in which his soundtrack for the film Faro won the award. He also won a Gudbagge in 2009 for his score for the film Everlasting Moments. He has recorded and released numerous solo and collaboration records, include Hydra’s Dream, with Anna Von Hausswolff; Maailma, with cult Finnish songwriter Lau Nau; and has collaborated live with producer and musician Samuli Kosminen.

Life and career 
Bye was brought up by his mother, renowned Swedish actress Birgitta Andersson, while his father was Norwegian playwright Anders Bye. At the age of 20, Stockholm’s celebrated Cinematheque Theatre contacted Bye about performing live to old silent films. “Silent film music was like a blank spot on the music map, but I recognised the freedom I’d have as a musician, and the force of the poetry in these forgotten images. To play piano for these films was like a dream. So I started my own ‘university’ in the cinema, improvising directly in front of the film screen, trying new pieces and styles in front of a live audience. The beauty is that you feel the past through these beautiful films,“ he says of the style that gradually developed in this environment, “but through the music you can add a new layer of something contemporary too.” As his reputation spread, Bye recognised that, thanks to the diversity of his interests, he’d stumbled on a singularly romantic style. “I started out as a piano improviser,” he says, “and suddenly I realised I was composing, and that I’m a composer.”

By the late 1990s, Bye had progressed from silent films to composing for new ones, including documentaries.  Since then Bye has composed music to over 30 films not to mention a host of music to theatre and dance pieces. In 2014 he received two of the three nominations for Best Original Music Award at Sweden’s prestigious Guldbaggen – his soundtrack for Faro took the honour (as well as a Nordic Film Music Prize) ahead of his work for The Hundred-Year-Old Man Who Climbed Out the Window And Disappeared. He’s also provided new music for, among others, Victor Sjöström’s seminal horror The Phantom Carriage (1921) and The Saga of Gosta Berling (1924), a landmark melodrama starring Greta Garbo.

He’s recorded a number of solo works, too, not least 2010’s Drömt and 2013’s Bethanien, the latter inspired by a two-year sojourn in Berlin working in Kreuzbergcultural centre of the same name.  In the Fall of 2017 Bye will release a new solo record titled This Forgotten Land as well as a soundtrack to the film Superswede.

Discography 
 2022 - Young Royals: Season 2 (Soundtrack from the Netflix series)
 2021 - Young Royals (Soundtrack from the Netflix series)
 2021 - Tove (Original Motion Picture Soundtrack)
 2019 - One Last Deal (Tuntematon mestari)
 2017 - Superswede (Original Film Soundtrack)
 2017 - This Forgotten Land (Tona Serenad) 
 2016 – Elephant made the piano EP (1631 Recordings)
 2016 – A Serious Game (Cosmos Music)
 2014 – Hydras Dream: The Little Match Girl (Denovali)
 2014 – Hundraåringen som klev ut genom fönstret och försvann
 2014 – Maiilma: Speculum (Rotor)
 2013 – Bethanien (Tona Serenad)
 2013 – Matti Bye: Faro (Rotor)
 2013 – Walrus (Electricity Records)
 2011 – Matti Bye, Mattias Olsson & Martina Hoogland Ivanow: Elephant & Castle (Kning Disk)
 2009 – Matti Bye: Drömt (Rotor)
 2009 – Vinter – Vinter II (Tjärnen)
 2008 – Matti Bye: Gösta Berlings Saga (Rotor)
 2008 – Maailma – Noitalauluja (Tjärnen)
 2003 – Matti Bye: Körlkarlen (Rotor)

Music for film 
 2022 - Dag för dag (Felix Herngren)
 2021 - Young royals (Netflix)
2020 - Tove (Zaida Bergroth)
 2020 - Livet efter döden (Klaus Härö)
 2019 - Tuntematon mestari (Klaus Härö)
 2017 - Superswede (Nice Drama)
 2017 - Enkelstöten (TV 4)
 2016 – Hundraettåringen som smet från notan och försvann (Felix Herngren, Måns Herngren)
 2016 – Den Allvarsamma Leken (Pernilla August)
 2015 – Förvaret (documentary)
 2013 – Hundraåringen som klev ut genom fönstret och försvann (Felix Herngren)
 2013 – Faro (Fredrik Edfelt)
 2011 – Snigeln (short, Jan Troell)
 2011 – Bibliotekstjuven (TV series)
 2010 – Filmen var min älskarinna "…But Film is My Mistress" (documentary about Ingmar Bergman)
 2010 – Sebbe (Babak Najafi)
 2009 – Bilder från lekstugan "Images from The Playground" (documentary about Ingmar Bergman)
 2009 – Elkland (short)
 2008 – Maria Larssons eviga ögonblick "Everlasting Moments" (Jan Troell)
 2008 – Mellan oss (short)
 2007 – Fritt fall (short)
 2006 – En uppstoppad hund (TV movie)
 2006 – Quinze (short)
 2006 – Brevbärarens hemlighet (short)
 2005 – Krama mig "Love and Happiness" (Kristina Humle)
 2005 – En god dag "A Good Day" (short)
 1999 – Vuxna människor (Felix Henrgren)
 1998 – Homo Sapiens 1900 (documentary by Peter Cohen)
 1995 – Sista skriket "The Last Gasp" (TV play by Ingmar Bergman)
 1924 – Gösta Berling Saga "The Saga of Gosta Berling" (Mauritz Stiller)
 1922 – Häxan "Witchcraft through ages" (restored version: 2006)
 1921 – Körkarlen "Phantom Carriage" (Victor Sjöström)
 1920 – Erotikon (Mauritz Stiller)
 1919 – Herr Arnes Pengar "Sir Arnes´s Treasures" (Mauritz Stiller)
 1916 – Dödskyssen (short) (restored version: 2002)

References

External links 
 Matti Bye at The Internet Movie Database
 Official Website 
 Eat Drink Films Interview

1966 births
Living people
Swedish composers
Swedish male composers
Swedish people of Norwegian descent
Swedish pianists
Male pianists
21st-century pianists
21st-century Swedish male musicians